The 1981 Special Honours in New Zealand was a Special Honours List, published on 8 May 1981 and with effect from 30 April 1981, in which New Zealand's outgoing deputy prime minister was recognised.

Member of the Order of the Companions of Honour (CH)
 The Right Honourable Brian Edward Talboys  – Minister of Foreign Affairs and Minister of Trade, lately Deputy Prime Minister of New Zealand.

References

Special honours
1981 awards